Gymnastics at the Alternate Olympics may refer to:

USGF International Invitational 1980 in gymnastics
Gymnastics at the Friendship Games, as part of the 1984 Olympic boycott